In phonology, vowel harmony is an assimilatory process in which the vowels of a given domain – typically a phonological word – have to be members of the same natural class (thus "in harmony"). Vowel harmony is typically long distance, meaning that the affected vowels do not need to be immediately adjacent, and there can be intervening segments between the affected vowels. Generally one vowel will trigger a shift in other vowels, either progressively or regressively, within the domain, such that the affected vowels match the relevant feature of the trigger vowel. Common phonological features that define the natural classes of vowels involved in vowel harmony include vowel backness, vowel height, nasalization, roundedness, and advanced and retracted tongue root.

Vowel harmony is found in many agglutinative languages. The given domain of vowel harmony taking effect often spans across morpheme boundaries, and suffixes and prefixes will usually follow vowel harmony rules.

Terminology

The term vowel harmony is used in two different senses.

In the first sense, it refers to any type of long distance assimilatory process of vowels, either progressive or regressive. When used in this sense, the term vowel harmony is synonymous with the term metaphony.

In the second sense, vowel harmony refers only to progressive vowel harmony (beginning-to-end). For regressive harmony, the term umlaut is used. In this sense, metaphony is the general term while vowel harmony and umlaut are both sub-types of metaphony. The term umlaut is also used in a different sense to refer to a type of vowel gradation. This article will use "vowel harmony" for both progressive and regressive harmony.

"Long-distance"

Harmony processes are "long-distance" in the sense that the assimilation involves sounds that are separated by intervening segments (usually consonant segments). In other words, harmony refers to the assimilation of sounds that are not adjacent to each other. For example, a vowel at the beginning of a word can trigger assimilation in a vowel at the end of a word. The assimilation occurs across the entire word in many languages. This is represented schematically in the following diagram:

{| cellspacing="5" style="font-size: 110%;"
! beforeassimilation
|  
! afterassimilation
|
|-
| VaCVbCVbC
| →
| VaCVaCVaC
|   (Va = type-a vowel, Vb = type-b vowel, C = consonant)
|}

In the diagram above, the Va (type-a vowel) causes the following Vb (type-b vowel) to assimilate and become the same type of vowel (and thus they become, metaphorically, "in harmony").

The vowel that causes the vowel assimilation is frequently termed the trigger while the vowels that assimilate (or harmonize) are termed targets. When the vowel triggers lie within the root or stem of a word and the affixes contain the targets, this is called stem-controlled vowel harmony (the opposite situation is called dominant). This is fairly common among languages with vowel harmony and may be seen in the Hungarian dative suffix:

{| cellspacing="5"
! Root
! Dative
! Gloss
|-
| 
| 
| 'city'
|-
| 
| 
| 'joy'
|}

The dative suffix has two different forms .

Features of vowel harmony

Vowel harmony often involves dimensions such as

 Nasalization   (i.e. oral or nasal) (in this case, a nasal consonant is usually the trigger) 

In many languages, vowels can be said to belong to particular sets or classes, such as back vowels or rounded vowels. Some languages have more than one system of harmony. For instance, Altaic languages are proposed to have a rounding harmony superimposed over a backness harmony.

Even among languages with vowel harmony, not all vowels need to participate in the vowel conversions; these vowels are termed neutral. Neutral vowels may be opaque and block harmonic processes or they may be transparent and not affect them. Intervening consonants are also often transparent.

Finally, languages that do have vowel harmony often allow for lexical disharmony, or words with mixed sets of vowels even when an opaque neutral vowel is not involved. Van der Hulst & van de Weijer (1995) point to two such situations: polysyllabic trigger morphemes may contain non-neutral vowels from opposite harmonic sets and certain target morphemes simply fail to harmonize. Many loanwords exhibit disharmony. For example, Turkish , ('time' [from Arabic ]); * would have been expected.

Languages with vowel harmony

Korean
There are three classes of vowels in Korean: positive, negative, and neutral. These categories loosely follow the front (positive) and mid (negative) vowels. Middle Korean had strong vowel harmony; however, this rule is no longer observed strictly in modern Korean. In modern Korean, it is only applied in certain cases such as onomatopoeia, adjectives, adverbs, conjugation, and interjections. The vowel  is considered a partially neutral and a partially negative vowel.

Mongolian

Mongolian exhibits both a tongue root harmony and a rounding harmony. The vowel  is phonetically similar to the -RTR vowels. However, it is largely transparent to vowel harmony. Rounding harmony only affects the open vowels, . Some sources refer to the primary harmonization dimension as pharyngealization or patalalness (among others), but neither of these is technically correct. Likewise, referring to ±RTR as the sole defining feature of vowel categories in Mongolian is not fully accurate either. In any case, the two vowel categories differ primarily with regards to tongue root position, and ±RTR is a convenient and fairly accurate descriptor for the articulatory parameters involved.

Turkic languages
Turkic languages inherit their systems of vowel harmony from Proto-Turkic, which already had a fully developed system. The one exception is Uzbek, which has lost its vowel harmony due to extensive Persian influence; however, its closest relative, Uyghur, has retained Turkic vowel harmony.

Azerbaijani
Azerbaijani's system of vowel harmony has both front/back and rounded/unrounded vowels.

Tatar
Tatar has no neutral vowels. The vowel é is found only in loanwords. Other vowels also could be found in loanwords, but they are seen as Back vowels. Tatar language also has a rounding harmony, but it is not represented in writing. O and ö could be written only in the first syllable, but vowels they mark could be pronounced in the place where ı and e are written.

Kazakh
Kazakh's system of vowel harmony is primarily a front/back system, but there is also a system of rounding harmony that is not represented by the orthography.

Kyrgyz
Kyrgyz's system of vowel harmony is primarily a front/back system, but there is also a system of rounding harmony, which strongly resembles that of Kazakh.

Turkish
Turkish has a 2-dimensional vowel harmony system, where vowels are characterised by two features: [±front] and [±rounded]. There are two sets of vocal harmony systems: a simple one and a complex one. The simple one is concerned with the low vowels e, a and has only the [±front] feature (e front vs a back). The complex one is concerned with the high vowels i, ü, ı, u and has both [±front] and [±rounded] features (i front unrounded vs ü front rounded and ı back unrounded vs u back rounded). The close-mid vowels ö, o are not involved in vowel harmony processes.

Front/back harmony
Turkish has two classes of vowelsfront and back. Vowel harmony states that words may not contain both front and back vowels. Therefore, most grammatical suffixes come in front and back forms, e.g. Türkiye'de "in Turkey" but Almanya'da "in Germany".

Rounding harmony
In addition, there is a secondary rule that i and ı in suffixes tend to become ü and u respectively after rounded vowels, so certain suffixes have additional forms. This gives constructions such as Türkiye'dir "it is Turkey", kapıdır "it is the door", but gündür "it is the day", karpuzdur "it is the watermelon".

Exceptions
Not all suffixes obey vowel harmony perfectly.

In the suffix -(i)yor, the o is invariant, while the i changes according to the preceding vowel; for example sönüyor – "he/she/it fades". Likewise, in the suffix -(y)ken, the e is invariant: Roma'dayken – "When in Rome"; and so is the i in the suffix -(y)ebil: inanılabilir – "credible". The suffix -ki exhibits partial harmony, never taking a back vowel but allowing only the front-voweled variant -kü: dünkü – "belonging to yesterday"; yarınki – "belonging to tomorrow".

Most Turkish words do not only have vowel harmony for suffixes, but also internally. However, there are many exceptions.

Compound words are considered separate words with respect to vowel harmony: vowels do not have to harmonize between members of the compound (thus forms like |gün "this|day" = "today" are permissible). Vowel harmony does not apply for loanwords, as in otobüs – from French "autobus". There are also a few native modern Turkish words that do not follow the rule (such as anne "mother" or kardeş "sibling" which used to obey vowel harmony in their older forms, ana and karındaş, respectively). However, in such words, suffixes nevertheless harmonize with the final vowel; thus annesi – "his/her mother", and voleybolcu – "volleyballer".

In some loanwords the final vowel is an a, o or u and thus looks like a back vowel, but is phonetically actually a front vowel, and governs vowel harmony accordingly. An example is the word saat, meaning "hour" or "clock", a loanword from Arabic. Its plural is saatler. This is not truly an exception to vowel harmony itself; rather, it is an exception to the rule that a denotes a front vowel.

Disharmony tends to disappear through analogy, especially within loanwords; e.g. Hüsnü (a man's name) < earlier Hüsni, from Arabic husnî; Müslüman "Moslem, Muslim (adj. and n.)" < Ottoman Turkish müslimân, from Persian mosalmân).

Uralic languages
Many, though not all, Uralic languages show vowel harmony between front and back vowels. Vowel harmony is often hypothesized to have existed in Proto-Uralic, though its original scope remains a matter of discussion.

Samoyedic
Vowel harmony is found in Nganasan and is reconstructed also for Proto-Samoyedic.

Hungarian

Vowel types
Hungarian, like its distant relative Finnish, has the same system of front, back, and intermediate (neutral) vowels but is more complex than the one in Finnish, and some vowel harmony processes. The basic rule is that words including at least one back vowel get back vowel suffixes (karba – in(to) the arm), while words excluding back vowels get front vowel suffixes (kézbe – in(to) the hand). Single-vowel words which have only the neutral vowels (i, í or é) are unpredictable, but e takes a front-vowel suffix.

One essential difference in classification between Hungarian and Finnish is that standard Hungarian (along with 3 out of 10 local dialects) does not observe the difference between Finnish 'ä'  and 'e' the Hungarian front vowel 'e'  is closely pronounced as the Finnish front vowel 'ä' . 7 out of the 10 local dialects have the vowel ë  which has never been part of the Hungarian alphabet, and thus is not used in writing.

Behaviour of neutral vowels
Unrounded front vowels (or Intermediate or neutral vowels) can occur together with either back vowels (e.g. répa carrot, kocsi car) or rounded front vowels (e.g. tető, tündér), but rounded front vowels and back vowels can occur together only in words of foreign origins (e.g. sofőr = chauffeur, French word for driver). The basic rule is that words including at least one back vowel take back vowel suffixes (e.g. répá|ban in a carrot, kocsi|ban in a car), while words excluding back vowels usually take front vowel suffixes (except for words including only the vowels i or í, for which there is no general rule, e.g. liszt|et, híd|at).

Some other rules and guidelines to consider:
 Compound words get suffix according to the last word, e.g.: ártér (floodplain) compound of ár + tér gets front vowel suffix just as the word tér when stands alone (tér|en, ártér|en)
 In case of words of obvious foreign origins: only the last vowel counts (if it is not i or í): sofőr|höz, nüansz|szal, generál|ás, október|ben, parlament|ben, szoftver|rel
 If the last vowel of the foreign word is i or í, then the last but one vowel will be taken into consideration, e.g. papír|hoz, Rashid|dal. If the foreign word includes only the vowels i or í then it gets front vowel suffix, e.g.: Mitch-nek ( = for Mitch)
 There are some non-Hungarian geographical names that have no vowels at all (e.g. the Croatian island of Krk), in which case as the word does not include back vowel, it gets front vowel suffix (e.g. Krk-re = to Krk)
 For acronyms: the last vowel counts (just as in case of foreign words), e.g.: HR (pronounced: há-er) gets front vowel suffix as the last pronounced vowel is front vowel (HR-rel = with HR)
 Some 1-syllable Hungarian words with i, í or é are strictly using front suffixes (gép|re, mély|ről, víz > viz|et, hír|ek), while some others can take back suffixes only (héj|ak, szíj|ról, nyíl > nyil|at, zsír|ban, ír|ás)
 Some foreign words that have fit to the Hungarian language and start with back vowel and end with front vowel can take either front or back suffixes (so can be optionally considered foreign word or Hungarian word): farmer|ban or farmer|ben

Suffixes with multiple forms
Grammatical suffixes in Hungarian can have one, two, three, or four forms:
 one form: every word gets the same suffix regardless of the included vowels (e.g. -kor)
 two forms (most common): words get either back vowel or front vowel suffix (as mentioned above) (e.g. -ban/-ben)
 three forms: there is one back vowel form and two front vowel forms; one for words whose last vowel is rounded front vowel and one for words whose last vowel is not rounded front vowel (e.g. -hoz/-hez/-höz)
 four forms: there are two back vowel forms and two front vowel forms (e.g. -ot/-at/-et/-öt or simply -t, if the last sound is a vowel)
An example on basic numerals:

Mansi
Vowel harmony occurred in Southern Mansi.

Khanty
In the Khanty language, vowel harmony occurs in the Eastern dialects, and affects both inflectional and derivational suffixes. The Vakh-Vasyugan dialect has a particularly extensive system of vowel harmony, with seven different front-back pairs:

Vowel harmony is lost in the Northern and Southern dialects, as well as in the Surgut dialect of Eastern Khanty.

Mari
Most varieties of the Mari language have vowel harmony.

Erzya
The Erzya language has a limited system of vowel harmony, involving only two vowel phonemes:  (front) versus  (back).

Moksha, the closest relative of Erzya, has no phonemic vowel harmony, though  has front and back allophones in a distribution similar to the vowel harmony in Erzya.

Finnic languages
Vowel harmony is found in most of the Finnic languages. It has been lost in Livonian and in Standard Estonian, where the front vowels ü ä ö occur only in the first (stressed) syllable. South Estonian Võro (and Seto) language as well as some [North] Estonian dialects, however, retain vowel harmony.

Finnish

In the Finnish language, there are three classes of vowelsfront, back, and neutral, where each front vowel has a back vowel pairing. Grammatical endings such as case and derivational endingsbut not encliticshave only archiphonemic vowels U, O, A, which are realized as either back  or front  inside a single word. From vowel harmony it follows that the initial syllable of each single (non-compound) word controls the frontness or backness of the entire word. Non-initially, the neutral vowels are transparent to and unaffected by vowel harmony. In the initial syllable:
 a back vowel causes all non-initial syllables to be realized with back (or neutral) vowels, e.g. pos+ahta+(t)a → posahtaa
 a front vowel causes all non-initial syllables to be realized with front (or neutral) vowels, e.g. räj+ahta+(t)a → räjähtää.
 a neutral vowel acts like a front vowel, but does not control the frontness or backness of the word: if there are back vowels in non-initial syllables, the word acts like it began with back vowels, even if they come from derivational endings, e.g. sih+ahta+(t)a → sihahtaa cf. sih+ise+(t)a → sihistä

For example:
 kaura begins with back vowel → kauralla
 kuori begins with back vowel → kuorella
 sieni begins without back vowels → sienellä (not *sienella)
 käyrä begins without back vowels → käyrällä
 tuote begins with back vowels → tuotteessa
 kerä begins with a neutral vowel → kerällä
 kera begins with a neutral vowel, but has a noninitial back vowel → keralla

Some dialects that have a sound change opening diphthong codas also permit archiphonemic vowels in the initial syllable. For example, standard 'ie' is reflected as 'ia' or 'iä', controlled by noninitial syllables, in the Tampere dialect, e.g. tiä ← tie but miakka ← miekka.

... as evidenced by tuotteessa (not *tuotteessä). Even if phonologically front vowels precede the suffix -nsa, grammatically it is preceded by a word controlled by a back vowel. As shown in the examples, neutral vowels make the system unsymmetrical, as they are front vowels phonologically, but leave the front/back control to any grammatical front or back vowels. There is little or no change in the actual vowel quality of the neutral vowels.

As a consequence, Finnish speakers often have problems with pronouncing foreign words which do not obey vowel harmony. For example, olympia is often pronounced olumpia. The position of some loans is unstandardized (e.g. chattailla/chättäillä) or ill-standardized (e.g. polymeeri, sometimes pronounced polumeeri, and autoritäärinen, which violate vowel harmony). Where a foreign word violates vowel harmony by not using front vowels because it begins with a neutral vowel, then last syllable generally counts, although this rule is irregularly followed. Experiments indicate that e.g. miljonääri always becomes (front) miljonääriä, but marttyyri becomes equally frequently both marttyyria (back) and marttyyriä (front), even by the same speaker.

With respect to vowel harmony, compound words can be considered separate words. For example, syyskuu ("autumn month" i.e. September) has both u and y, but it consists of two words syys and kuu, and declines syys·kuu·ta (not *syyskuutä). The same goes for enclitics, e.g. taaksepäin "backwards" consists of the word taakse "to back" and -päin "-wards", which gives e.g. taaksepäinkään (not *taaksepäinkaan or *taaksepainkaan). If fusion takes place, the vowel is harmonized by some speakers, e.g. tälläinen pro tällainen ← tämän lainen.

Some Finnish words whose stems contain only neutral vowels exhibit an alternating pattern in terms of vowel harmony when inflected or forming new words through derivation. Examples include meri "sea", meressä "in the sea" (inessive), but merta (partitive), not *mertä; veri "blood", verestä "from the blood" (elative), but verta (partitive), not *vertä; pelätä "to be afraid", but pelko "fear", not *pelkö; kipu "pain", but kipeä "sore", not *kipea.

Helsinki slang has slang words that have roots violating vowel harmony, e.g. Sörkka. This can be interpreted as Swedish influence.

Yokuts

Vowel harmony is present in all Yokutsan languages and dialects. For instance, Yawelmani has 4 vowels (which additionally may be either long or short). These can be grouped as in the table below.

In addition to the harmony found in suffixes, there is a harmony restriction on word stems where in stems with more than one syllable all vowels are required to be of the same lip rounding and tongue height dimensions. For example, a stem must contain all high rounded vowels or all low rounded vowels, etc. This restriction is further complicated by (i) long high vowels being lowered and (ii) an epenthetic vowel  which does not harmonize with stem vowels.

Sumerian
What appears to be vowel contraction in hiatus (*/aa/, */ia/, */ua/ > a, */ae/ > a, */ue/ > u, etc.) is also very common.

Other languages
Vowel harmony occurs to some degree in many other languages, such as
 Several dialects of Arabic (see imala) including:
 Palestinian Arabic 
 Iraqi Arabic
 Lebanese Arabic
 Akan languages (tongue root position)
 Assamese
 Australian Aboriginal languages
 Jingulu 
 Warlpiri
 Assyrian Neo-Aramaic (vowel harmony of one particular timbre across all vowels of a word)
 Several Bantu languages such as:
 Standard Lingala (height)
 Kgalagadi (height)
 Malila (height)
 Phuthi (right-to-left and left-to-right)
Shona
 Southern Sotho (right-to-left and left-to-right)
 Northern Sotho (right-to-left and left-to-right)
 Tswana (right-to-left and left-to-right)
 Bezhta
 Bengali
 Some Chadic languages, such as Buwal
 Chukchi
 Coeur d'Alene (tongue root position and height)
 Coosan languages
 Dusun languages
 Iberian languages
 Astur-Leonese
 Galician and Portuguese dialects
 Catalan/Valencian
 Eastern Andalusian Spanish
 Murcian Spanish
 Igbo (tongue root position)
Italo-Romance languages: several Swiss Italian dialects (including total vowel harmony systems).
 Japanese language - in some of the Kansai dialects. Additionally, some  consider that vowel harmony must have existed at one time in Old Japanese, though there is no broad consensus. See the pertinent .
 Maiduan languages
 Nez Percé
 Nilotic languages
 Buchan Scots is a Scots dialect with vowel height harmony, compare  "hairy",  "really". This effect is blocked by voiced obstruents and certain consonant clusters:  "baby",  "lumpy".
 Somali
 Takelma
 Telugu
 Several Tibetic languages, including Lhasa Tibetan
 Tungusic languages, such as Manchu
Tuvan
 Utian languages
Urhobo
 Yurok and Qiang are unique in having rhotic vowel harmony.

Other types of harmony

Although vowel harmony is the most well-known harmony, not all types of harmony that occur in the world's languages involve only vowels. Other types of harmony involve consonants (and is known as consonant harmony). Rarer types of harmony are those that involve tone or both vowels and consonants (e.g. postvelar harmony).

Vowel–consonant harmony

Some languages have harmony processes that involve an interaction between vowels and consonants. For example, Chilcotin has a phonological process known as vowel flattening (i.e. post-velar harmony) where vowels must harmonize with uvular and pharyngealized consonants.

Chilcotin has two classes of vowels:

 "flat" vowels 
 non-"flat" vowels 

Additionally, Chilcotin has a class of pharyngealized "flat" consonants . Whenever a consonant of this class occurs in a word, all preceding vowels must be flat vowels.

If flat consonants do not occur in a word, then all vowels will be of the non-flat class:

Other languages of this region of North America (the Plateau culture area), such as St'át'imcets, have similar vowel–consonant harmonic processes.

Syllabic synharmony
Syllabic synharmony was a process in the Proto-Slavic language ancestral to all modern Slavic languages. It refers to the tendency of frontness (palatality) to be generalised across an entire syllable. It was therefore a form of consonant–vowel harmony in which the property 'palatal' or 'non-palatal' applied to an entire syllable at once rather than to each sound individually.

The result was that back vowels were fronted after j or a palatal consonant, and consonants were palatalised before j or a front vowel. Diphthongs were harmonized as well, although they were soon monophthongized because of a tendency to end syllables with a vowel (syllables were or became open). This rule remained in place for a long time, and ensured that a syllable containing a front vowel always began with a palatal consonant, and a syllable containing j was always preceded by a palatal consonant and followed by a front vowel.

A similar process occurs in Skolt Sami, where palatalization of consonants and fronting of vowels is a suprasegmental process applying to a whole syllable. Suprasegmental palatalization is marked with the letter ʹ, which is a Modifier letter prime, for example in the word vääʹrr 'mountain, hill'.

See also
 A-mutation
 Ablaut reduplication
 Apophony
 Consonant harmony
 Consonant mutation
 Germanic umlaut
 I-mutation
 Metaphony
 U-mutation

References

Bibliography

 Arias, Álvaro (2006): «La armonización vocálica en fonología funcional (de lo sintagmático en fonología a propósito de dos casos de metafonía hispánica)», Moenia 11: 111–139.
 
 Jacobson, Leon Carl. (1978). DhoLuo vowel harmony: A phonetic investigation. Los Angeles: University of California.
 Krämer, Martin. (2003). Vowel harmony and correspondence theory. Berlin: Mouton de Gruyter.
 Li, Bing. (1996). Tungusic vowel harmony: Description and analysis. The Hague: Holland Academic Graphics.

Piggott, G. & van der Hulst, H. (1997). Locality and the nature of nasal harmony. Lingua, 103, 85-112.

 Shahin, Kimary N. (2002). Postvelar harmony. Amsterdam: John Benjamins Pub.
 Smith, Norval; & Harry van der Hulst (Eds.). (1988). Features, segmental structure and harmony processes (Pts. 1 & 2). Dordrecht: Foris.  (pt. 1),  (pt. 2 ) .
 Vago, Robert M. (Ed.). (1980). Issues in vowel harmony: Proceedings of the CUNY Linguistic Conference on Vowel Harmony, 14 May 1977. Amsterdam: J. Benjamins.
 Vago, Robert M. (1994). Vowel harmony. In R. E. Asher (Ed.), The Encyclopedia of language and linguistics (pp. 4954–4958). Oxford: Pergamon Press.
Walker, R. L. (1998). Nasalization, Neutral Segments, and Opacity Effects (Doctoral dissertation). University of California, Santa Cruz.

Assimilation (linguistics)